Matore is a village, surrounded by hills, in the heart of Kahuta Tehsil a subdivision of Rawalpindi District, in the Punjab province of Pakistan. Some major tourist attractions in Maira-Matore include the shrine of the Janjua ancestor “Dada Pir Kala” and a pond created by Maharaja Ranjit Singh called “Badda.” 

The village is consisted of predominantly the Janjua Rajput clan and holds the record of producing the highest number of army officers from all ranks, in the entire world. Over 500+ people have reached the rank of Lieutenants, 25+ people have reached the rank of Brigadier, nine people have reached the rank of Maj. General, and five people have reached the rank of Lt. General. Other famous personalities of Matore include Amir Khan (boxer), and Chairman Pakistan Muslim League (N) Senator Raja Zafar-ul-Haq.

The nine Generals of Matore are listed below:

1. Late Shah Nawaz Khan (general) Janjua (14th Punjab Reg. Indian Military Academy Dehradun. British Army. Azad Hind Army. Indian Army). Son of Subedar Tikka Khan Janjua.

2. Late Lt. Gen. Ahmad Jamal Khan Janjua (13 Baloch Reg. 1st PMA L/C. Ex-Corp Commander Karachi 1980-1984). Son of Maj. Khudadad Khan Janjua, Son of Army Engineer Kala Khan Janjua, Son of Subedar Fazal Khan Janjua.

3. Late Lt. Gen. Ahmad Kamal Khan Janjua (10 Frontier Force Reg. Ex-Deputy Chief of Army Staff 1988-1989. Ex-Corp Commander Peshawar 1987-1989). Son of Maj. Khudadad Khan Janjua, Son of Army Engineer Kala Khan Janjua, Son of Subedar Fazal Khan Janjua.

4. Late Lt. Gen. Saleem Arshad Janjua (Punjab Reg.). Son of Col. Karimdad Janjua.

5. Lt. Gen. Khalid Nawaz Khan Janjua (Baloch Reg. 51 PMA L/C. Sword of Honor. Ex-Corp Commander Rawalpindi 2010-2013). Son of Col. Nawaz Ahmad Khan Janjua (Neeli or Lili-ji), Son of Subedar Tikka Khan Janjua. 

6. Lt. Gen. Zaheer-ul-Islam Janjua (Punjab Reg. 55 PMA L/C. Ex-DG ISI 2012-2014. Ex Corp Commander Karachi 2010-2012). Son of Brig. Ghulam Muhammad Janjua, Son of Karam Khan Janjua. 

7. Late Major. Gen. Shahid Hamid Jamal Khan Janjua (Armored Corp. Royal Military Academy Sandhurst UK. International Sword of Honor. Commander 1st Armored Div. Multan 2010). Son of Lt. Gen Ahmad Jamal Khan Janjua, Son of Maj. Khudadad Khan Janjua, Son of Army Engineer Kala Khan Janjua, Son of Subedar Fazal Khan Janjua. 

8. Late Major. Gen. Asif Nawaz Khan Janjua (Armored Corp.). Son of Col. Nawaz Ahmad Khan Janjua (Neeli or Lili-ji), Son of Subedar Tikka Khan Janjua. 

9. Major. Gen. Asad Nawaz Khan Janjua (3 Sindh Regiment. Currently Director General Military Training (DG MT) at T&E Branch, GHQ Rawalpindi in year 2023). Son of Col. Mahmood Nawaz Khan Janjua, Son of Major. Gen. Shah Nawaz Khan Janjua, Son of Subedar Tikka Khan Janjua.

References

the news
Dawn

Populated places in Kahuta Tehsil
Union councils of Kahuta Tehsil